The Bundesstraße 93 (Abbreviation: B93) is a road in the German states of Saxony and Thuringia. It goes from Borna, Leipzig to Schneeberg. It is the main route between Leipzig and Zwickau.

Route 
 The road goes through the following districts: Leipzig (district) – Altenburger Land – Zwickau (district) – Erzgebirgskreis
 Towns on the B 93: Borna, Leipzig – Altenburg – Gößnitz – Meerane – Zwickau – Wilkau-Haßlau – Schneeberg

The road goes alongside the following rivers: Pleiße, Zwickauer Mulde.

See also 
 List of roads in Saxony
List of federal roads in Germany

External links 

 Bürgerinitiative B93

093
B093
B093